The following list is a  discography of production by Jermaine Dupri, a record producer and recording artist. It includes a list of songs produced, co-produced and remixed by year, album, artist and title.

Singles produced

1990-1997

Jermaine Dupri - 12 Soulful Nights of Christmas
01 - "The Time of Year" (featuring Kenny Lattimore)
02 - "Christmas Without You" (gesturing Xscape)
12 - "My Younger Days" (featuring Trey Lorenz)
13 - "Every Day Should Be Christmas" (featuring NeeNa Lee)
14 - "This Christmas" (featuring Jagged Edge)

1997

Usher - My Way
01 - "You Make Me Wanna"
02 - "Just Like Me" (featuring Lil' Kim)
03 - "Nice and Slow"
04 - "Slow Jam" (featuring Monica)
05 - "My Way"
06 - "Come Back" (featuring Jermaine Dupri)
08 - "Bedtime"
09 - "One Day You'll Be Mine"
10 - "You Make Me Wanna" (Extended Version)

LSG - Levert.Sweat.Gill
04 - "Where Did I Go Wrong" - (featuring Jermaine Dupri)

Jagged Edge - A Jagged Era

01.- "Slow Motion"
02.- "Addicted To Your Love"
03.- "I Gotta Be" (co-produced with Manuel Seal)
04.- "Wednesday Lover"
05.- "Funny How"
06.- "The Way You Talk" (featuring Da Brat)
07.- "The Best Of Our Lives"
08.- "I'll Be Right There" (featuring Busta Rhymes)
09.- "Ready & Willing"
10.- "Ain't No Stoppin'"

Mase - Harlem World
15 - "Cheat on You" (featuring Lil' Cease, Jay-Z & 112) (Produced by Jermaine Dupri)

Mariah Carey
"Honey" - (So So Def Remix) (featuring Da Brat and Jermaine Dupri)

1998

Xscape - Traces of My Lipstick
01 - "All About Me (Intro)"
02 - "My Little Secret"
04 - "Do You Know"
07 - "I Will"
13 - "All About Me (Reprise)"

Destiny's Child - Destiny's Child
03 - "With Me Part I" - (featuring Jermaine Dupri) (Produced by Jermaine Dupri)

Jermaine Dupri - Life in 1472
02 - "Money Ain't a Thang" (Featuring Jay-Z) (Produced by Jermaine Dupri)
04 - "Fresh" (Featuring Slick Rick) (Produced by Jermaine Dupri & Slick Rick)
05 - "Sweetheart" (Featuring Mariah Carey) (Produced by Jermaine Dupri & Mariah Carey)
06 - "Jazzy Hoes" featuring 8Ball, Too Short & Mister Black (Produced by Jermaine Dupri)
07 - "Don't Hate on Me" (Featuring Da Brat & Krayzie Bone) (Produced by Jermaine Dupr)
08 - "Going Home with Me" (Featuring Keith Sweat & ROC) (Produced by Jermaine Dupri)
09 - "You Get Dealt Wit" (Featuring Mase & Lil' Kim) (Produced by Jermaine Dupri)
10 - "The Party Continues" (video version) (Featuring Da Brat & Usher) (Produced by Jermaine Dupri)
13 - "Lay You Down" (Featuring Trina & Tamara) (Produced by Jermaine Dupri)

Cam'ron - Confessions Of Fire
04 - "Rockin' & Rollin'"

Jay-Z - Vol. 2... Hard Knock Life
14 - "Money Ain't a Thang (featuring Jermaine Dupri)

Mack 10 - The Recipe
03 - "You Ain't Seen Nothin'" (featuring Jermaine Dupri and Foxy Brown)

Mariah Carey
"My All/Stay Awhile" - (So So Def remix) (featuring Lord Tariq and Peter Gunz)

Mariah Carey - #1'S
01 - "Sweetheart" - (featuring Jermaine Dupri)

Monica - The Boy Is Mine
04 - "The First Night"

Kid Capri - Soundtrack to the Streets
12 - "Be Alright" - (featuring Cam'Ron and Jermaine Dupri)

DJ Clue - The Professional
14 - "Bitch Be a Ho" - (featuring Jermaine Dupri and R.O.C)

Tamia - Tamia
01 - "Imagination" - (featuring Jermaine Dupri)

Lord Tariq & Peter Gunz - Make It Reign
19 - "Be My Lady" (featuring Jagged Edge & Jermaine Dupri) (Hidden Bonus Track)

Kelly Price
"Secret Love" (So So Def mix) (featuring Da Brat)

1999

Various Artists - Wild Wild West soundtrack
15.- "Stick Up" (Lil' Bow Wow Featuring Jermaine Dupri)

TLC - FanMail
10 - "My Life"

Usher - Live
15 - "My Way" - (JD's remix, featuring Jermaine Dupri)

Harlem World - The Movement
15 - "We Both Frontin'" - (featuring Jermaine Dupri)

Mariah Carey - Rainbow
04 - "How Much" (featuring Usher)"

Master P - Only God Can Judge Me
20 - "Da Ballers" - (featuring Jermaine Dupri)

Various artists - In Too Deep Soundtrack
07 - "Keys to the Range" - (Jagged Edge featuring Jermaine Dupri)

Warren G - I Want It All
06 - "Havin' Things" - (featuring Jermaine Dupri and Nate Dogg)

2000

Jagged Edge - J.E. Heartbreak
01. - "Heartbreak"
02.- "Did She Say"
04.- "What You Tryin To Do"
05.- "Girl Is Mine" (featuring Ja Rule & Jermaine Dupri)
06.- "Healing"
07.- "Let's Get Married" (co-produced with Bryan-Michael Cox)
08.- "True Man"
09.- "Can I Get With You"
10.- "Promise"
11.- "Keys To The Range" (featuring Jermaine Dupri)
12.- "Lace You"

Various Artists- Big Momma's House soundtrack
01.- "That's What I'm Looking For"( Mr. Dupri Remix) (Da Brat featuring Missy Elliott & Jermaine Dupri)
02.- "I've Got To Have It" (featuring Nas & Monica) (co-produced with Bryan-Michael Cox)
04.- "Bounce With Me" (Lil' Bow Wow) (co-produced with Bryan-Michael Cox)
07.- "Big Momma's Theme" (Da Brat & Vita featuring Destiny's Child)
08.- "Treated Like Her" (LaTocha Scott featuring Chante Moore)
14.- "I Still Got To Have It" (featuring Nas & Monica)

Bow Wow - Beware of Dog
05 - "You Know Me" - (featuring Jermaine Dupri and Da Brat)
08 - "This Playboy" - (featuring Jermaine Dupri, R.O.C. and Big Duke)

Ludacris - Back for the First Time
07 - "Get Off Me" - (featuring Pastor Troy)

C-Murder - Trapped in Crime
05 - "How a Thug Like It" - (featuring Da Brat & Jermaine Dupri)

Funkmaster Flex - Funkmaster Flex Presents The Mix Tape Volume 4: 60 Minutes Of Funk
15 - "Did She Say" - (So So Def remix) (featuring Jagged Edge, Jermaine Dupri, Da Brat and Bow Wow)

The Brothers - Brothers Soundtrack
02 - "Lay It Down" - (Jermaine Dupri featuring R.O.C. and Lil Mo)

Da Brat - Unrestricted
01.- "Intro" (featuring Millie Jackson & Twista) (co-produced with Timbaland)
02.- "We Ready" (featuring Jermaine Dupri & Lil Jon) (co-produced with Carl Lowe)
03.- "What'chu Like" (featuring Tyrese) (co-produced with Bryan-Michael Cox)
05.- "**** You"
06.- "Back Up" (featuring Ja Rule and Tamara Savage)
09.- "That's What I'm Looking For"
11.- "What's On Ya Mind" (featuring 22, LaTocha Scott, & Trey Lorenz)
13.- "High Come Down" (featuring LaTocha Scott & Trey Lorenz)
14.- "All My *******" (co-produced with Bryan-Michael Cox)
15.- "Pink Lemonade" (co-produced with Carl Lowe)

Bone Thugs-n-Harmony - The Collection: Volume Two
02 - "Don't Hate on Me" - (featuring Jermaine Dupri and Da Brat)

2001

Various Artists- Hardball Soundtrack
01.- "Live The Life" (featuring Fundisha)
02.- "Hardball" (Lil' Bow Wow, Lil Wayne, Lil' Zane & Sammie)
04.- "Where The Party At ('01 Dupri Remix)" (featuring Jagged Edge, Lil' Bow Wow, Da Brat, Tigah & R.O.C.)
05.- "Insomnia" (Fundisha)
07.- "Ghetto" (featuring R.L.)
09.- "Ball Game" (Da Brat)
11. "Who Ya Love" (R.O.C.)
12. "Rest Of My Life" (Xscape)

Christina Milian -Christina Milian(Album) 
•07: “A Girl like Me”

Usher - 8701 
 05 - "U Got It Bad"
 06 - "If I Want To" (produced with Babyface)
 07 - "I Can't Let U Go"
 13 - "Good Ol' Ghetto"
 14 - "U-Turn"
 16 - "T.T.P." (International Version)

Greg Street - 6 O'Clock Vol. 1 
02 - Somebody Better Tell 'Em - (featuring Jermaine Dupri and Tigah)

UGK - Dirty Money 
14 - "Money, Hoes & Power" - (featuring Jermaine Dupri)

Mariah Carey - Greatest Hits 
08 - "Sweetheart" - (featuring Jermaine Dupri) (DISC 2)
14 - "All I Want For Christmas Is You" - (So So Def remix) (featuring Jermaine Dupri and Bow Wow) (DISC 2)

Alicia Keys - Songs in A Minor 
02 - "Girlfriend"

Cappadonna - The Yin and the Yang 
 06. "We Know" (featuring Jermaine Dupri & Da Brat)

Tyrese - 2000 Watts 
 10. "Off The Heezy" (featuring Jermaine Dupri)

Jermaine Dupri - Instructions 
02.- "Welcome To Atlanta" (featuring Ludacris)
03.- "Money, Bones & Power" (featuring UGK, Pimpin' Ken, & Manuel Seal)
05.- "Get Some" (featuring Usher, R.O.C., & Boo & Gotti)
07.- "Hate Blood" (featuring Jadakiss, & Freeway) (co-produced with Swizz Beatz)
08.- "Ballin' Out Of Control" (featuring Nate Dogg)
09.- "Superfly" (featuring Bilal)
11.- "Rules Of The Game" (featuring Manish Man)
13.- "Whatever" (featuring Tigah, R.O.C., & Nate Dogg)
14.- "Let's Talk About It" (featuring Clipse, & Pharrell Williams) (co-produced with The Neptunes)
15.- "Yours & Mine" (featuring Jagged Edge)
16.- "Jazzy Bones Part 2 (featuring Kurupt, Too $hort, Field Mob, Backbone, & Eddie Cain)
18.- "You Bring The Freak Out Of Me" (featuring Da Brat)
20.- "Rock With Me" (featuring Xscape)

Jagged Edge - Jagged Little Thrill 
02.- "Where The Party At" (featuring Nelly)
03.- "Goodbye"
04.- "Cut Somethin' (featuring Ludacris)
05.- "Girl It's Over"
06.- "Can We Be Tight"
07.- "I Got It" (featuring Trina)
08.- "Best Man"
09.- "Without You"
10.- "Driving Me To Drink (featuring R.O.C.)
11.- "This Goes Out" (featuring Big Duke & Joe Blak)
12.- "Respect"
13.- "Head Of Household"
14.- "Remedy"

Bow Wow - Doggy Bag 
01.- "We Want Weezy (Intro) (co-produced with Bryan-Michael Cox)
02. "Thank You" (featuring Jagged Edge, & Fundisha) (co-produced with Bryan-Michael Cox)
03.- "Take Ya Home" (produced by The Neptunes)
04.- "Get Up" (featuring Fundisha) (co-produced with Bryan-Michael Cox)
06.- "All I Know" (featuring Lil Corey) (co-produced with Bryan-Michael Cox)
07.- "The Wickedest" (co-produced with Bryan-Michael Cox)
08.- "Pick Of The Litter" (featuring R.O.C., & Tigah) (co-produced with Bryan-Michael Cox)
09.- "Crazy" (featuring Da Brat) (co-produced with Bryan-Michael Cox)
11.- "Up In Here" (featuring Tigah) (co-produced with Bryan-Michael Cox)
13.- "Off The Glass" (featuring Xscape) (co-produced with Bryan-Michael Cox)

Nate Dogg - Music & Me 
06 - "Your Woman Has Just Been Sighted (Ring the Alarm)" - (featuring Jermaine Dupri)

2002

Various Artists- Like Mike soundtrack
01.- "Basketball" (Lil Bow wow featuring Fabolous and Jermaine Dupri)
02.- "NBA 2K2" (R.O.C.)
08.- "Can I Holla" (Young Steff featuring Lil Bow Wow)

Destiny's Child - This Is the Remix
10 - "Jumpin', Jumpin'" - (So So Def remix) (featuring Bow Wow, Jermaine Dupri and Da Brat)

Birdman - Birdman
12 - "How It Be" - (featuring Jermaine Dupri and TQ)

Mariah Carey - Charmbracelet
03 - "The One"
09 - "You Had Your Chance"
16 - "Miss You" (featuring Jadakiss)

Drumline - Drumline Soundtrack
02 - "Been Away" - (Q "The Kid" featuring Jermaine Dupri)

Monica - All Eyez on Me
03 - "U Should've Known Better"
04 - "Too Hood" - (featuring Jermaine Dupri)
09 - "If U Were The Girl"

Tyrese - I Wanna Go There
08 - "Girl I Can't Help It" - (featuring Jermaine Dupri)

2003

Mariah Carey - The Remixes
12 - The One (So So Def Remix) (featuring Bone Crusher) (DISC 2)

Bone Crusher - AttenCHUN!
02 - "Never Scared (Intro)" - (featuring Jermaine Dupri)

Da Brat - Limelite, Luv & Niteclubz
01 - "World Premiere" - (featuring Jermaine Dupri, M.O.P. and Q "The Kid")

Monica - After the Storm
04 - "U Should've Known Better"

Murphy Lee - Murphy's Law
09 - "Wat da Hook Gon Be" - (featuring Jermaine Dupri)

Chingy - Jackpot
17 - "Right Thurr (Remix)" (featuring Jermaine Dupri & Trina) (Bonus Track)

Anthony Hamilton - Comin' From Where I'm From
01. - "Mama Knew Love"

Jagged Edge - Hard
04 - "Visions" (produced with Bryan-Michael Cox)
13 - "Shady Girl" (produced with Bryan-Michael Cox)

Marques Houston - MH
03 - "Pop That Booty" - (featuring Jermaine Dupri)

Lil' Jon - Certified Crunk
06 - "Get Crunk Radio" - (featuring Jermaine Dupri)

2004

J-Kwon - Hood Hop
12 - "My Enemies" - (featuring Jermaine Dupri)

Tamia - More
04 - "Still"

Shawnna - Worth Tha Weight
06 - "U Crazy" - (featuring Jermaine Dupri)

Usher - Confessions
 "Confessions, Pt. 2 (Remix)" (ft. Kanye West, Twista, Shyne, and Jermaine Dupri)

Twista - Kamikaze
18 - "Freek-a-Leek" - (remix) (featuring Petey Pablo and Jermaine Dupri)

Jermaine Dupri - Green Light

2005

N2U - Issues
03 - "Baby Mama Love" - (featuring Jermaine Dupri)

112 - Pleasure & Pain
11 -   "The Way" - (featuring Jermaine Dupri)

Mariah Carey - Emancipation Of Mimi
01 - "It's Like That"
02 - "We Belong Together"
03 - "Shake It Off"
07 - "Get Your Number"
15 - "Don't Forget About Us"
16 - "Makin' It Last All Night (What It Do?)"

Bow Wow - Wanted
04 - "Fresh Azimiz" - (featuring J-Kwon and Jermaine Dupri)
08 - "Go - (with Jermaine Dupri)
09 - "Do What It Do" - (featuring Jermaine Dupri)

Syleena Johnson - Chapter III: The Flesh
07 - "Classic Love Song" - (featuring Jermaine Dupri)

Dru Hill - Hits
17 - "In My Bed" (So So Def remix) (featuring Jermaine Dupri and Da Brat)

Chris Brown - Chris Brown
14 - Run It! - (So So Def remix) (featuring Bow Wow and Jermaine Dupri)

Jermaine Dupri - Young, Fly & Flashy, Vol. 1

Jermaine Dupri - Da Bottom Vol. 5

Will Smith - Gettin' Jiggy wit It (iTunes Triple Play)
 03. "Gettin' Jiggy wit It (So So Def Remix)" (featuring Jermaine Dupri, Big Pun, R.O.C., and Cam'ron)

2006

Dem Franchize Boyz - On Top Of Our Game
02 - "Oh, I Think They Like Me (So So Def Remix)" (featuring Jermaine Dupri, Da Brat & Bow Wow)
13 - "Hidden Track: "White Tee" (Remix) (featuring Jermaine Dupri & The Kid Slim)

Avant - Director
15 - "G.P.S.A" "(Ghetto Public Service Announcement)" (featuring Jermaine Dupri)

Isley Brothers - Baby Makin' Music
04 - "Gotta Be with You" produced with Bryan-Michael Cox
06 - "Forever Mackin'" produced with Bryan-Michael Cox
09 - "Beautiful" produced with Manuel Seal

Monica - The Makings of Me
01 - "Everytime Tha Beat Drop" (featuring Dem Franchize Boyz)
04 - "Why Her"
09 - "Getaway"

Jagged Edge - Jagged Edge
03 - "So High"
09 - "So Amazing" (featuring Voltio)

Donell Jones - Journey Of A Gemini
02 - "Better Start Talking" - (featuring Jermaine Dupri)

Chingy - Hoodstar
07 - Dem Jeans - (with Jermaine Dupri)

3LW - Point of No Return
00. - "Feelin' You" (featuring Jermaine Dupri)
00. - "The Way I Feel About You" (featuring Bow Wow)
00. - "Beat of My Drum"
00. - "Big Girl"

Jagged Edge - The Hits
05 - Where the Party At (So So Def Remix) (featuring Jermaine Dupri, Da Brat, R.O.C., Bow Wow and Tigah)
10 - Stunnas (featuring Jermaine Dupri)

Janet Jackson - 20 Y.O.
02. So Excited (feat Khia)
03. Show Me
04. Get It Out Me
05. Do It To Me
06. This Body
07. With You
08. Call On Me (feat Nelly)

Daz Dillinger - So So Gangsta
02 - "On Some Real" (featuring Rick Ross) produced with LRoc
04 - "Weekend" (featuring Johntá Austin) produced with LRoc
06 - "Badder Than a Mutha" (featuring Avery Storm) produced with LRoc
10 - "All I Need"
11 - "The One" (featuring Jagged Edge) produced with LRoc

Bow Wow - The Price of Fame

2007

Paul Wall - Get Money, Stay True
04 - I'm Throwed - (featuring Jermaine Dupri) (Produced By Jermaine Dupri)

Donell Jones - "The Best Of Donell Jones"
08 - Better Start Talking - (featuring Jermaine Dupri)

Bone Thugs-n-Harmony - Strength & Loyalty
05 - "Lil Love" - (featuring Mariah Carey and Bow Wow) (Produced by Jermaine Dupri)

Jermaine Dupri - Y'All Know What This Iz...The Hits

Jagged Edge - Baby Makin' Project
02 - "Put A Little Umph In It" (featuring Ashanti) (Produced By Jermaine Dupri & Manuel Seal)
05 - "Get This" (Produced By Jermaine Dupri & Manuel Seal)
06 - "I'll Be Damned" (Produced By Jermaine Dupri & Manuel Seal)
08 - "Way To Say I Love You" (Produced By Jermaine Dupri & Manuel Seal)
12 - "Put A Little Umph In It" (So So Def Remix) (featuring Ashanti) (Produced By Jermaine Dupri & Manuel Seal)

Jay-Z - American Gangster
12 - Success - (featuring Nas) (Produced By No I.D., co-produced by Jermaine Dupri)
13 - Fallin' - (featuring Bilal) (Produced By Jermaine Dupri, co-produced by No I.D.)

2008

Mariah Carey - E=MC²
03 - "Cruise Control" (featuring Damian Marley) (Produced By Mariah Carey, Jermaine Dupri, Johnson, Damian Marley, Seal)
07 - "Love Story" (Produced By Mariah Carey, Jermaine Dupri, Seal)
09 - "Last Kiss" (Produced By  Mariah Carey,  Jermaine Dupri, Seal)
10 - "Thanx 4 Nothin'" (Produced By Mariah Carey, Jermaine Dupri, Seal)
"Bye Bye Remix" (featuring Jay-Z) (Produced By Jermaine Dupri) (not on cd)

Janet Jackson - Discipline
07 - "Rock With U" (Co-produced with Eric Stanmile)
11 - "Never Letchu Go" (Co-produced with Manoel Seal)
15 - "So Much Betta"  (Co-produced with Manoel Seal)
17 - "The One" (ft. Missy Elliott)
18 - "What's Your Name" (Co-produced with Manoel Seal)

Usher - Here I Stand
08 - "Something Special" (Co-produced with No I.D. and Manuel Seal)
10 - "Best Thing" (ft. Jay-Z)
19 - "Chivalry (Bonus Track)" (ft. Jermaine Dupri)

Ashanti - The Declaration
09 - "Good Good" (Produced by Ashanti, Jermaine Dupri, Manuel Seal)

Nelly - Brass Knuckles
09 - Stepped On My J'z (ft. Ciara)

2009

Fabolous - Loso's Way
07 - "Money Goes, Honey Stay (When the Money Goes Remix)"
11 - "Makin Love"
12 - "Last Time"

Bow Wow - New Jack City Part 2
02 - "What They Call Me" (featuring Nelly and Ron Browz) co-produced with LRoc
03 - "Roc the Mic" (featuring Jermaine Dupri) co-produced with LRoc
05 - "You Can Get It All" (featuring Johntá Austin) co-produced with LRoc
06 - "Sunshine" co-produced with LRoc
07 - "Like This" (featuring Johntá Austin and Dondria) co-produced with LRoc
09 - "I Ain't Playing" (featuring Trey Songz) co-produced with LRoc

Hot Dollar - 100 Laws Of Power 2.0 (So So Def Version)

Mariah Carey - H.A.T.E.U (So So Def Remix)

2010

Monica - Still Standing
09 - "Love All Over Me" (Produced with Bryan-Michael Cox)

Usher - Raymond v. Raymond
09 - "Foolin' Around"

Mariah Carey - Merry Christmas II You
02 - "Oh Santa!" (Produced with Bryan-Michael Cox & Mariah Carey)
07 - "Here Comes Santa Claus" (Produced with Bryan-Michael Cox & Mariah Carey)
14 - "Oh Santa (Remix)" (Produced with Bryan-Michael Cox & Mariah Carey) (iTunes pre-order bonus track)

2011

Verbal - Visionair
02 - "Black Out" (featuring Lil Wayne + Namie Amuro)

2012

Monica - New Life
09 - "Amazing" (Produced with Bryan-Michael Cox)

Brandon Hines - Non-album single
"Yes You Are"

Leah LaBelle - Non-album single
"What Do We Got To Lose"

2014

Mariah Carey - Me. I Am Mariah... The Elusive Chanteuse
06 - "Make It Look Good" (Produced with Bryan-Michael Cox)
08 - "You Don't Know What to Do" (feat. Wale) (Produced with Bryan-Michael Cox)
09 - "Supernatural" (Produced with Bryan-Michael Cox)
13 - "One More Try" (Produced with Bryan-Michael Cox)
14 - "Heavenly (No Ways Tired / Can't Give Up Now)" (Produced with Bryan-Michael Cox)

Jagged Edge - J.E. Heartbreak 2
03 - "Familiar" (Produced with Bryan-Michael Cox)
04 - "Hope" (Produced with Bryan-Michael Cox)
05 - "Things I Do For You" (Produced with Bryan-Michael Cox)
08 - "Wanna Be (Romeo)" (Produced with Bryan-Michael Cox)
09 - "Getting Over You" (Produced with Bryan-Michael Cox)

2015

Fifth Harmony - Reflection
07 - "Like Mariah"

2017

Star Cast - Season 2: Soundtrack
02. "I Want You"

2018

Mariah Carey - Caution
04 - "A No No" (Produced with Carey and Shea Taylor)

Credited produced or written singles
 1989: "Do Your Dance"  (Silk Tymes Leather)
1992: "Jump  (Kriss Kross)
 1992: "Tear It Up (On Our Worst Behavior)" (Immature)
 1997: "You Make Me Wanna" (Usher)
 1998: "Nice & Slow" (Usher)
 2001: "U-Turn" (Usher)
 2001: "Welcome to Atlanta" (Jermaine Dupri featuring Ludacris)
 2001: "What's Going On" Artists Against Aids Worldwide
 2003: "Wat Da Hook Gon Be" (Murphy Lee featuring Jermaine Dupri)
 2004: "Confessions Pt 2" (Usher)
 2004: "Burn" (Usher)
 2005: "Let Me Hold You" (Bow Wow featuring Omarion)
 2004: "My Boo" (Usher & Alicia Keys)
 2005: "It's Like That" (Mariah Carey)
 2005: "We Belong Together" (Mariah Carey)
 2005: "Like You" (Bow Wow featuring Ciara)
 2005: "Shake It Off" (Mariah Carey)
 2005: "Fresh Azimiz" (Bow Wow featuring J-Kwon & Jermaine Dupri)
 2005: "Grillz" (Nelly featuring Paul Wall, Ali & Gipp)
 2005: "I Think They Like Me [Remix]" (Dem Franchize Boyz featuring Jermaine Dupri, Da Brat, & Bow Wow)
 2006: "Don't Forget About Us" (Mariah Carey)
 2006: "Ridin' Rims" (Dem Franchize Boyz)
 2006: "Call On Me" (Janet Jackson featuring Nelly)
 2006: "Pullin' Me Back" (Chingy featuring Tyrese)
 2006: "So Excited" (Janet Jackson featuring Khia)
 2006: "Dem Jeans" (Chingy featuring Jermaine Dupri)
 2006: "Get Throwed" (Paul Wall featuring Jermaine Dupri)
 2006: "Shortie Like Mine" (Bow Wow featuring Chris Brown)
 2007: "Outta My System" (Bow Wow featuring T-Pain)
 2007: "Baby Don't Go" (Fabolous featuring T-Pain)
 2007: "Lil L.O.V.E." (Bone Thugs-N-Harmony featuring Mariah Carey & Bow Wow)
 2008: "Rock With U" (Janet Jackson)
 2008: "Stepped On My J'z" (Nelly featuring Jermaine Dupri & Ciara)
 2008: "Good Good" (Ashanti)
 2010: "Love All Over Me" (Monica)
 2010: "Oh Santa!" (Mariah Carey)
 2017: " I Don't" (Mariah Carey featuring YG)

References

Production discographies
Discographies of American artists
Hip hop discographies
 
 
Rhythm and blues discographies
Pop music discographies